Marcos Nahuel Enrique (born 30 December 1999) is an Argentine professional footballer who plays as a central midfielder for Uruguayan club Cerro Largo, on loan from Vélez Sarsfield.

Career
Enrique began his career with local side Atlético Franck, before having a three-year stint with Santa Fe FC. In 2013, following a trial, the central midfielder joined Vélez Sarsfield. Enrique was promoted into their first-team squad towards the end of the curtailed 2019–20 campaign, appearing as an unused substitute for Primera División fixtures with San Lorenzo and Arsenal de Sarandí in February 2020. Nine months later, in November, Enrique made his senior debut in the Copa Sudamericana against Deportivo Cali; replacing Federico Mancuello in the eleventh minute of stoppage time in a 2–0 victory under Mauricio Pellegrino.

On 10 March 2021, Enrique joined Primera Nacional club Instituto on a loan deal for the rest of 2021 with a purchase option. However, the deal was terminated on 27 August 2021, with Enrique instead heading to Cerro Largo, once again on a loan deal, this time until the end of 2022 including a purchase option.

Style of play
Enrique started out as a goalkeeper at Atlético Franck, though soon changed to become a forward after being hit in the stomach by the ball. His father, who worked for Atlético, later transitioned him into a central midfielder.

Career statistics
.

Notes

References

External links

1999 births
Living people
People from Las Colonias Department
Argentine footballers
Association football midfielders
Sportspeople from Santa Fe Province
Club Atlético Vélez Sarsfield footballers
Instituto footballers
Cerro Largo F.C. players
Argentine Primera División players
Primera Nacional players
Uruguayan Primera División players